Siim Liivik (born 14 February 1988) is an Estonian-Finnish professional ice hockey winger who is currently an unrestricted free agent.

Playing career
Liivik started his professional career with HIFK in 2008. Before joining the Helsinki-based club's first team, Liivik played in the United States with the Waterloo Black Hawks of the United States Hockey League. He has also represented HIFK at different youth levels.

He made his first appearance for HIFK in the 2008–09 season opener against local rivals Jokerit on 11 September 2008. On 30 September 2008 he scored his first SM-liiga goal when HIFK faced KalPa at home. Liivik won Finnish hockey championship in the 2010–11 season. After his first professional seasons with HIFK, Liivik transferred as a free agent to fellow Liiga outfit, the Espoo Blues on 8 April 2013.

After three seasons with the Blues and a short return stint with HIFK, Liivik signed his first contract abroad in agreeing to a two-year contract with Swedish club, Örebro HK, of the SHL on 27 April 2016.

International play
Liivik was a represented Finland national team in the World U20 Championships for in 2008.  Liivik opted to join the Estonian national team in the November 2018 Baltic Challenge Cup.

Personal
Under his known nickname Märkä-Simo, Siim Liivik was featured in the music video of the 2011 single "Häissä" by Finnish rappers Jare & VilleGalle. The single released on the Monsp Finnish record label, proved very popular and reached the top of the Finnish Singles Chart. The official music video directed by andrei6000 features Märkä-Simo rapping with the duo.

Career statistics

Regular season and playoffs

International

Achievements

SM-liiga
 Kanada-malja (Finnish Ice hockey champion): 2010–11
 EBEL-League (Austrian Ice hockey champion): 2018–19

References

External links

Liivik's player profile on SM-liiga's website 

1988 births
EC KAC players
Espoo Blues players
Estonian emigrants to Finland
Estonian ice hockey left wingers
Finnish ice hockey left wingers
HIFK (ice hockey) players
Kiekko-Vantaa players
KooKoo players
Living people
Örebro HK players
Sportspeople from Paide
Waterloo Black Hawks players
Sportspeople from Vantaa
Finnish expatriate ice hockey players in Sweden
Finnish expatriate ice hockey players in the United States
Finnish expatriate ice hockey players in Austria
Estonian expatriate sportspeople in the United States
Estonian expatriate ice hockey people
Estonian expatriate sportspeople in Sweden
Estonian expatriate sportspeople in Austria